The 1922–23 Irish Cup was the 43rd edition of the premier knock-out cup competition in Northern Irish football. 

Linfield won the tournament for the 15th time, defeating Glentoran 2–1 in the final at Solitude.

Results

Quarter-finals

|}

1 After a protest, Distillery were awarded victory.

Replay

|}

Second replay

|}

Third replay

|}

Semi-finals

|}

Final

References

External links
 Northern Ireland Cup Finals. Rec.Sport.Soccer Statistics Foundation (RSSSF)

Irish Cup seasons
1922–23 domestic association football cups
1922–23 in Northern Ireland association football